The Fantastic Journey is an American science fiction television series that was originally aired on NBC from February 3 through June 16, 1977. It was originally intended to run 13 episodes, as a mid-season replacement, but NBC cancelled the series in April, after the ninth episode aired. A tenth episode, already produced, was burned off two months later.

Premise 
The series concerns a family and their associates who charter a boat out into the Caribbean for a scientific expedition.  After an encounter in the area of the Bermuda Triangle with an unnatural luminous green cloud accompanied by the eerie disembodied sound of ship's bells, the group find themselves shipwrecked on a mysterious uncharted island from which they are unable to escape.

They encounter Varian (Jared Martin), initially disguised as an Arawak native, who is later revealed to be from the year 2230.  A 23rd-century pacifist, musician and healer, Varian explains to the travelers that, like he and many before them, they have been caught in a space/time continuum where people from the past, present, future and from other worlds are trapped, co-existing on the island in a series of "Time Zones".  The only way home can be found in a place called "Evoland", which lies "far to the rising sun".  (It was indicated in interviews of the time that Evoland was also the name of the island.) The only way to travel between Time Zones is via invisible gateways that instantaneously transport individuals or groups from one zone to another. In one episode, "Beyond the Mountain", the group also encounters a second cloud, which has much the same effect, but which also splits up the group.

After the initial pilot story, a steady group of travelers forms around Varian as de facto leader, and the series then follows this group as they travel across the many Time Zones of the island to find Evoland. On their way, they encounter people from different planets and times who are also trapped on the island and who have adapted to their plight in different ways. The pilot initially suggested the historical past would be explored; however, the producers of the show rapidly adopted a consistently futuristic tone during the series following pressure from the network. They also dropped three characters after the pilot, as they wanted a more exotic group of travelers, hence the arrival of Liana and Willoway. Liana disappears from the last two episodes when Katie Saylor fell ill.

Cast
 Varian (Jared Martin): "A man from the 23rd century possessing awesome powers", Varian generally uses a kind of crystalline "tuning fork" device called the Sonic Energizer through which he focuses his thoughts into what is described as a sonic manipulation of matter.  The device is completely useless in anyone else's hands, and seems capable of a huge variety of tasks, from opening doors to disrupting electrical systems to large scale acts of destruction, as well as its apparently intended function as a diagnostic and healing device. Following the departure of Professor Paul Jordan at the end of the pilot film, Varian takes over as de facto leader to the travelers and adopts a parental role over Paul's teenage son, Scott (most notable in episodes such as "An Act of Love" and "Turnabout").
 Scott Jordan (Ike Eisenmann): "The 13-year-old son of a famous scientist", Scott has an excellent knowledge of Earth history and events, but is still young and has much to learn.
 Dr. Fred Walters (Carl Franklin): "A young doctor just out of medical school" whose impulsive and rather hot-headed nature acts as a counterpoint to the calm, pacifistic Varian.  A friend of Scott's father and the only other member of the group from the same time period, the athletic black physician takes the role of protective "older brother" with the young teen.
 Liana (Katie Saylor): "Daughter of an Atlantean father and an extraterrestrial mother". The beautiful blonde Liana possessed greater than human physical strength due to her mother being from a planet with a higher gravity than Earth. (However, not much use was ever actually made of Liana's strength.) She also had powerful psychic abilities (presumably due to her mixed heritage) which allow her to, among other things, telepathically communicate with animals - especially her cat Sil-El. Saylor left the show after the episode "Turnabout" due to illness. In the next episode "Riddles" the reason for her not being present with the group was given that she opted to stay a few days at Coriel to help the inhabitants work out their new government and would catch up with the group later.
 Dr. Jonathan Willoway (Roddy McDowall): "Rebel scientist from the 1960s" who has a mastery of computers, robotics and scientific knowledge which is quite useful to the group. He is something of a never entirely trustworthy black sheep, basically a cooler version of Doctor Smith from Lost in Space without the congenital cowardice, who often tends to do things for his own mysterious reasons. Over the course of the episodes, however, the black-clad Willoway comes to care about Scott and his fellow travelers and becomes more integrated into the group, although Fred makes no secret about still not trusting him which leads to a bickering Spock/McCoy-style relationship between the two.
 Sil-El (The Felix Team): Liana's companion and pet, a "tuxedo cat" with which she can communicate telepathically and who sometimes scouts ahead for her, acting as an extra set of eyes and ears.

Production
D. C. Fontana recalled that once the show had been commissioned, she and the producers had a very short period of time to develop and produce the show before filming commenced. Additional footage was shot and inserted into the pilot, introducing the Atlanteans, who are the focus of Episode 2. The addition of these scenes resulted in quickly moving off-screen the characters of Paul, Eve and Jill. They were originally intended to be regulars, but the network wanted a more diverse set of travelers. A subplot involving the group finding a Air Force pilot from the 1940s, held prisoner by 16th-century pirates, was removed from the first episode as well.

The character of Willoway was created with McDowall specifically in mind. The actor was interested, and took the role when it was offered.

The show benefited from more location filming than usual, with familiar sites such as the Hollywood Hills, Zuma Beach, the Bonaventure Hotel in Los Angeles, and Griffith Observatory appearing in various episodes. 

Although it aired in a time when the nation's interest in the Bermuda Triangle, UFOs and fantasy was at a height, the show failed to find success. It was originally scheduled opposite The Waltons and Welcome Back, Kotter, both very popular family series, as a midseason replacement for another failed fantasy show in that time slot, Gemini Man. NBC would repeatedly preempt and move the series before finally giving up on it, after only ten of the twelve episodes that the network had ordered to follow the revised pilot had been produced. The script for an eleventh episode, "Romulus", was once available on the Internet. 

Within a few months of the abrupt end of production, several of the team that worked on the series would be producing the thematically similar Logan's Run for the 1977–1978 television season.

Episodes

References

External links 

 
 
 John Kenneth Muir's Retro TV Files - Retrospective
 Episode guide with links to screen caps and images, plus a 1977 article

1977 American television series debuts
1977 American television series endings
1970s American science fiction television series
Bermuda Triangle in fiction
English-language television shows
NBC original programming
Television series by Sony Pictures Television
Television shows set in New York City